Lemuy Island is an island in Chiloé Archipelago, Chile, off the eastern coast of Chiloé Island.

There are nine villages on the island.
On the north coast:
 Puqueldón
 Aldachildo
 Ichuac
On the south coast:
 Chulchuy. From here the ferry leaves for Huicha on Chiloé Island.
 Lincay, with a wooden church dating from the beginning of the 20th century
 Liucura, with a wooden church which was built in the middle of the 19th century
On the east coast:
 Detif
 Puchilco. In the wooden church dating from the 19th century there are paintings by the Peruvian artist Miguel Gamarra
In the middle of the island:
 San Agustín, the only village which is not on the coast. The wooden church was built at the beginning of the 20th century.

As in the rest of the archipelago, the population of Lemuy Island were inspired by a deep religious faith and built 8 churches, each special in its own way. Some, like Ichuac, Aldachildo and Detif are more than 100 years old and have recently been declared World Heritage Sites, along with 15 other Chilote churches. Some have picturesque cemeteries with little shingled mausoleums.

See also
 List of islands of Chile

References

External links
 
 Islands of Chile @ United Nations Environment Programme
 World island information @ WorldIslandInfo.com
 South America Island High Points above 1000 meters
 United States Hydrographic Office, South America Pilot (1916)

Islands of Chiloé Archipelago